John Brewse (Bruce) was a British military engineer who created the first surveys of Halifax, Nova Scotia (1749). He was largely responsible for fortifying the town against native and Acadian attacks. He also was wounded in the Battle at Chignecto.

References 

British military engineers
History of Nova Scotia
People of Father Le Loutre's War